Lawrence County is a county located in the U.S. state of Tennessee. As of the 2020 census, the population was 44,159. Its county seat and largest city is Lawrenceburg. Lawrence County comprises the Lawrenceburg, TN Micropolitan Statistical Area, which is also included in the Nashville-Davidson-Murfreesboro, TN Combined Statistical Area.

History
Created by an act of the Tennessee General Assembly on October 21, 1817, Lawrence County was formed from lands previously part of Hickman and Giles counties.

It was named in honor of Captain James Lawrence (1781–1813), who while commanding the USS Chesapeake in an 1813 battle with the Royal Navy frigate HMS Shannon, issued his famous command: "Don't give up the ship! Blow her up." His men did anyway and Lawrence died of wounds.

Lawrenceburg was chosen as the county seat in 1819 as it was near the center of the county and because Jackson's Military Road ran just east of the town. In April 1821, the road was redirected through the center of the Lawrenceburg. The military road, the main route from New Orleans, Louisiana, to Nashville, Tennessee, played a significant role in the county's development.

An early resident was David Crockett, who served as one of the county's first commissioners and justices of the peace. Crockett lived in the county for several years and ran a water-powered grist mill, powder mill and distillery on Shoal Creek, (originally called the Sycamore River) where David Crockett State Park is now located.

In the early 1870s, many German Catholics moved into the area, including skilled tradesmen. After the arrival of the railroad in 1883, the county became a major source of iron ore.

Between 1908 and 1915, there was an influx of settlers from Alabama. Most were cotton growers or worked in the timber industry. Logging soon declined, since the forests were not replanted after trees were harvested; however, cotton continued to be a major crop until the 1960s.

In 1944, Amish people moved to the area and established a community in the north of the county. The Old Order Amish community has now become a tourist attraction.

The county has been struck by two killer tornadoes. On May 18, 1995 a F4 tornado struck the county. On April 16, 1998, an F5 tornado hit the county, part of the 1998 Nashville tornado outbreak.

In June 2010, the Tennessee Commission of Indian Affairs gave official recognition to six Native American groups, including the Central Band of Cherokee, also known as the Cherokee of Lawrence County. The recognition of these tribes at a state level has stirred much controversy among federally recognized Indian tribes, who claim the recognition by a state is unconstitutional and threatens the status of existing tribes.

In July 2017, the Hope Botanical Garden was formed in the Leoma community.

Geography

Major highways
 U.S. Route 43
 U.S. Route 64
 Tennessee State Route 20
 Tennessee State Route 98
 Tennessee State Route 227
 Tennessee State Route 240
 Tennessee State Route 241
 Tennessee State Route 242
 Natchez Trace Parkway

Rail
Tennessee Southern Railroad

Air
Lawrenceburg-Lawrence County Airport

Adjacent counties
Lewis County (north)
Maury County (northeast)
Giles County (east)
Lauderdale County, Alabama (south)
Wayne County (west)

National protected area
 Natchez Trace Parkway (part)

State protected areas
 David Crockett State Park
 Laurel Hill Wildlife Management Area

Demographics

2020 census

As of the 2020 United States census, there were 44,159 people, 15,960 households, and 11,028 families residing in the county.

2000 census
As of the census of 2000, there were 39,926 people, 15,480 households, and 11,362 families residing in the county.  The population density was 65 people per square mile (25/km2).  There were 16,821 housing units but as of 2010 that had jumped to over 19,000 at an average density of 27 per square mile (11/km2).  The racial makeup of the county was 96.83% White, 1.47% Black or African American, 0.32% Native American, 0.24% Asian, 0.02% Pacific Islander, 0.39% from other races, and 0.73% from two or more races.  1.00% of the population were Hispanic or Latino of any race.

There were 15,480 households, out of which 33.70% had children under the age of 18 living with them, 59.10% were married couples living together, 10.60% had a female householder with no husband present, and 26.60% were non-families. 23.70% of all households were made up of individuals, and 11.40% had someone living alone who was 65 years of age or older.  The average household size was 2.56 and the average family size was 3.02.

In the county, the population was spread out, with 26.20% under the age of 18, 8.40% from 18 to 24, 28.10% from 25 to 44, 23.00% from 45 to 64, and 14.40% who were 65 years of age or older.  The median age was 36 years. For every 100 females there were 94.30 males.  For every 100 females age 18 and over, there were 90.20 males.

The median income for a household in the county was $30,498, and the median income for a family was $35,326. Males had a median income of $27,742 versus $20,928 for females. The per capita income for the county was $15,848.  About 10.70% of families and 14.60% of the population were below the poverty line, including 19.20% of those under age 18 and 16.30% of those age 65 or over.

Government 
Lawrence County's chief executive officer is the County Executive. Along with the County Executive, the county has a total of 18 county commissioners which control the County's finances. Every fiscal year the Board must adopt a budget which appropriates funds to the many departments and agencies of the Lawrence County Government; and, at the same time, provides sufficient revenue to meet these appropriations.

The Board of County Commissioners serves as the legislative and policy setting body of Lawrence County. As such, the Board enacts all legislation and authorizes programs and expenditures within Lawrence County.

For the term starting in 2014, the officials for Lawrence County are:
 County Executive T.R. Williams (Chairman)
 District 1 Wayne Yocom
 District 2 Chris D. Jackson (Chairman Pro-Tempore)
 District 3 Denny Gillespie
 District 4 Brandon Brown
 District 5 Phil Hood
 District 6 Bobby Clifton
 District 7 Aaron Story
 District 8 Mark Niedergeses
 District 9 Ronnie Benefield
 District 10 Delano Benefield
 District 11 Scott Franks
 District 12 Jim Modlin
 District 13 Alanna Harris
 District 14 Nathan Keeton
 District 15 Tammy Wisdom 
 District 16 Shane Eaton
 District 17 Bert Spearman
 District 18 Russ Brewer

Politics
In Tennessee, a state defined for nearly a century after the civil war by Republican landslides in the east of the state balanced out by Democratic landslides in the middle and west of the state, Lawrence County was a rare swing county. Lawrence only voted for two losers between 1904 and 2004, Charles Evans Hughes in 1916 and Richard Nixon in 1960. Since 2008, the county has rapidly become overwhelmingly Republican, as has most of Tennessee.

Communities

Cities
Lawrenceburg (county seat)
Loretto
St. Joseph

Towns
Ethridge

Census-designated places
Iron City (small portion in Wayne County)
Leoma
Summertown (small portion in Lewis County and Maury County)
 Westpoint

Unincorporated communities
Alexander Springs
Appleton
 Carpenter's Station
Five Points
Henryville
Liberty Grove
Oak Hill
Spring Creek

Notable people
Michael Jeter, actor 
Fred Thompson, former U.S. Senator
David Weathers, Major League Baseball player
John Paul White, musician
Ryan Weathers, Major League Baseball player

See also
National Register of Historic Places listings in Lawrence County, Tennessee

References

External links

 Official site

 Lawrence County Archives
 Lawrence County at TNGenWeb

 
1817 establishments in Tennessee
Populated places established in 1817
Counties of Appalachia
Middle Tennessee